Parapolitics is a term for a 2006 scandal involving Colombian politicians and the paramilitary group the United Self-Defense Forces of Colombia.

Parapolitics may also refer to:

Raghavan N. Iyer, for whom parapolitics is a method of rethinking the foundations and frontiers of political principles, systems, and issues 
Peter Dale Scott, who uses the term parapolitics as one aspect of his theory of "deep politics"
Lobster (magazine), a UK magazine focused on how politics has been influenced by intelligence and security services